Brandon Matera (born 11 March 1992) is a former professional Australian rules footballer who played for the Gold Coast Football Club (2011–2017) and the Fremantle Football Club (2018–2020) in the Australian Football League (AFL). He was recruited as one of twelve 17-year-olds made available to Gold Coast under the AFL's draft concessions.

Matera is the son of former Fitzroy and West Coast player Wally Matera and the nephew of former West Coast footballers Phil and Peter Matera. He is of Italian and Indigenous Australian (Noongar) heritage.

Junior career
Matera came up through the junior system of the South Fremantle Football Club and represented Western Australia at under-16 and under-18 levels.

Matera was named in the 2009 Under-18 All Australian team following the 2009 AFL National Under-18 Championships.

AFL career

Gold Coast: 2011–2017

Matera made his debut in Round 2, 2011, in the Gold Coast Suns inaugural AFL match against Carlton at the Gabba.

In Round 5, Matera was part of the first Gold Coast Suns victory. He kicked 4 goals, and for his efforts was the round 5 nomination for the 2011 AFL Rising Star.

Fremantle: 2018–2020

References

External links

1992 births
Living people
South Fremantle Football Club players
Gold Coast Football Club players
Australian rules footballers from Western Australia
Indigenous Australian players of Australian rules football
Australian people of Italian descent
Fremantle Football Club players
Peel Thunder Football Club players
Subiaco Football Club players